Robert Jacques "Rob" Groen (18 February 1938 – November 2018) was a Dutch rower. He competed at the 1964 Summer Olympics in the single sculls and finished in seventh place. He won two silver medals in this event at the European championships in 1963 and 1964.

References

External links 
 

1938 births
2018 deaths
Dutch male rowers
Rowers at the 1964 Summer Olympics
Olympic rowers of the Netherlands
Rowers from Amsterdam
European Rowing Championships medalists